Hans Kesting (born 6 October 1960) is a Dutch actor. He appeared in more than fifty films since 1987. He was diagnosed with HIV in 1996. In 2016 he was awarded the Louis d'Or.

Selected filmography

Toneelgroep Amsterdam 
1987 Tree from the tropics - Toneelgroep Amsterdam
1987 Ismene or the blinded tumbler - Toneelgroep Amsterdam 
1987 Edward ll - Toneelgroep Amsterdam
1988 In the loneliness of the cotton fields- Toneelgroep Amsterdam 
1988 Back in the desert- Toneelgroep Amsterdam 
1990 Ballet - Toneelgroep Amsterdam 
1992 The sequel- Toneelgroep Amsterdam
1993 Count your blessings - Toneelgroep Amsterdam 
1993 Othello - Toneelgroep Amsterdam 
1993 Glenn - Toneelgroep Amsterdam 
1994 Richard lll - Toneelgroep Amsterdam
1994 Moonlight- Toneelgroep Amsterdam
1994 In the executive room- Toneelgroep Amsterdam 
1995 Ecstacy - Toneelgroep Amsterdam 
1995 Ivanov -  Toneelgroep Amsterdam
1995 Raw food- Toneelgroep Amsterdam
1996 Prometheus - Toneelgroep Amsterdam 
1996 Srebrenica! - Toneelgroep Amsterdam 
1996 Spring wake up- Toneelgroep Amsterdam
1996 Light - Toneelgroep Amsterdam 
1997 Crown year- Toneelgroep Amsterdam
1997 A kind of hades- Toneelgroep Amsterdam 
1997 Her life, her death- Toneelgroep Amsterdam
1998 Herakles - Toneelgroep Amsterdam
1998 Delayed farewell- Toneelgroep Amsterdam
1998 Bakchanten - Toneelgroep Amsterdam
1999 Dark Lady - Toneelgroep Amsterdam 
1999 Oom Wanja - Toneelgroep Amsterdam
1999 An ideal woman- Toneelgroep Amsterdam 
1999 De Cid - Toneelgroep Amsterdam 
2002 The night of the bonobos- Toneelgroep Amsterdam 
2003-'14 Othello - Toneelgroep Amsterdam 
2003 Three Sisters- Toneelgroep Amsterdam 
2003-'14 Mourning becomes electra - Toneelgroep Amsterdam
2004 Romeo and Julia - Toneelgroep Amsterdam
2004-'06 Crusades - Toneelgroep Amsterdam 
2005-'13 The taming of the shrew - Toneelgroep Amsterdam 
2005-'08 Perfect Wedding - Toneelgroep Amsterdam 
2006-'08 Oresteia - Toneelgroep Amsterdam 
2007-17 Roman Tragedies - Toneelgroep Amsterdam 
2007 Ajax - Toneelgroep Amsterdam 
2008-'13 Angels in America - Toneelgroep Amsterdam 
2008 Rocco and his brothers - Toneelgroep Amsterdam 
2009'-'11 Antonioni Project - Toneelgroep Amsterdam 
2010 Summer Trilogy - Toneelgroep Amsterdam 
2010-'16 Opening Night -Toneelgroep Amsterdam 
2010 Phaedra - Toneelgroep Amsterdam 
2011-'12 Ghosts - Toneelgroep Amsterdam
2011-'14 The Russians! - Toneelgroep Amsterdam
2011-'14 The Miser - Toneelgroep Amsterdam
2012-'13 Husbands - Toneelgroep Amsterdam 
2012-'13 Macbeth - Toneelgroep Amsterdam 
2013-'14 The Seagull - Toneelgroep Amsterdam 
2014 Danton's Death - Toneelgroep Amsterdam 
2014-'17 The Fountainhead - Toneelgroep Amsterdam
2014 Mary Stuart - Toneelgroep Amsterdam 
2015-'17 Kings of war - Toneelgroep Amsterdam 
2016-'17 The kindly ones - Toneelgroep Amsterdam 
2016-'17 The things that pass - Toneelgroep Amsterdam 
2017 Ibsen House - Toneelgroep Amsterdam
2020 Who killed my father - Toneelgroep Amsterdam

References

External links 
Hans Kesting at Toneelgroep Amsterdam

Dutch male television actors
1960 births
Living people
Dutch male film actors
People with HIV/AIDS
Dutch LGBT actors
20th-century Dutch people